Tuzla International Airport;  is an airport near Tuzla, Bosnia and Herzegovina. Tuzla International Airport is the second largest airport in Bosnia and Herzegovina, after Sarajevo International Airport. The airport is known as a low-cost airline hub of Bosnia and Herzegovina, since it is used by people from Bosnia, the diaspora and travellers from neighbouring countries Croatia and Serbia. The airport is a civilian airport and also was a military airbase.

History

Early years
Tuzla International was once the largest military airport in the former Yugoslavia. The 350th Reconnaissance Aviation Squadron was active there for a time.

In the early 1990s, still within Yugoslavia and prior start of the Bosnian War, Yugoslav airliner Air Commerce performed commercial flights from Sarajevo and Tuzla to Austria and Switzerland.

It was placed under the control of the United Nations Protection Force in 1992, and from 1996 onwards, it became the main hub for the Implementation Force (IFOR), which was charged with supervising the implementation of the Dayton Agreement. In 1998, the canton of Tuzla turned Tuzla International to a civil airport. Tuzla International opened on 10 October 1998 as a civilian airport and military airfield. After the complete international military withdrawal, Tuzla International Airport began implementation of all technical requirements and standards imposed by the International Civil Aviation Organization.

Development since the 2000s
Finally, on 5 June 2008, Tuzla International Airport obtained Provisional Certificate for Public Use Airport in international air transportation valid for one year. After general audit implemented by authorized institutions of Civil Aviation in BiH, on 5 June 2009, Tuzla International Airport obtained Certificate for Public Use Airport in international air transportation with unlimited period of validity.

In June 2015, Hungarian low-cost carrier Wizz Air opened an operating base in Tuzla, by basing one Airbus A320 at the airport. After base opening, total Wizz Air destinations from Tuzla jumped to 9, including 22 weekly departures in the summer flight schedule. 2 June 2016, Turkish Airlines Cargo began operating flights from Tuzla to Istanbul–Atatürk. The Turkish government allocated a quota of 15,000 tons of fresh meat and meat products to import from Bosnia and Herzegovina. Total of 90 flights with Airbus A330 freighter aircraft were planned for 2016. This was the only wide-body aircraft flight operating to and from Bosnia and Herzegovina at the time. On 31 August 2016, Wizz Air announced that it would base its second aircraft at Tuzla Airport as of 27 March 2017. From March 2017, the airline started operating five new services from Tuzla to Cologne/Bonn, Friedrichshafen, and Nuremberg in Germany, Bratislava in Slovakia and Växjö in Sweden. Wizz Air also announced its newest route connecting Tuzla with London–Luton in the United Kingdom beginning 30 October, Billund in Denmark beginning 31 October, and Berlin–Schönefeld beginning 17 December. Total number of weekly flights increased to 43 round trip flights, serving 16 destinations in 7 countries. On 2 November 2016, Tuzla International Airport announced start of terminal expansion and reconstruction. Capacity of the new building is going to be 700.000 passengers per year. The reconstruction was finished in May 2019. In November 2017, Wizz Air stopped flying to London-Luton, Nuremberg and Bratislava. 2017 was the record year for Tuzla Airport since it opened its doors, passing half a million passengers for the first time ever. In June 2018, Wizz Air started operating flights from Tuzla to Karlsruhe/Baden-Baden in Germany. In May 2021, Ryanair planned to launch two routes from Tuzla to Weeze and Karlsruhe/Baden-Baden with potential future routes to Stockholm, London-Stansted, Malta and Memmingen. However, the government blocked and did not approve the flights. On 12 August 2021, Wizz Air announced that it would base its third base aircraft in Tuzla and open two new routes to Milan-Malpensa and Nuremberg in December 2021.

Facilities

Terminal

The passengers' terminal building opened in 1998, provides a capacity of 350 passengers per peak hour. The terminal is equipped with one gate for arrival and departure, two check-in counters for registration of passengers, services for handicapped passengers, ticketing service as well as further passenger amenities and a border guard (SBS) control (24 hours) equipped with x-ray machines and customs control. Since passenger terminal has reached its capacity in 2015. Government of Federation of Bosnia and Herzegovina has decided to allocate 2 million KM (approximate 1 million €) in the year 2016 budget for initial plans and works for a new terminal building, while the Government of Tuzla Canton secured 500.000 KM for installation of new and improved approach lighting system. Many rent a car agencies have offices at the airport and the airport also provides long term parking for road vehicles.

Aprons
Tuzla Airport has three aprons, currently two in use: passenger aircraft apron with size 116 x 106 meters and cargo apron with approximately same size. Aprons are designed to service all classes of aircraft. Two medium size aircraft Boeing 737 or Airbus 320 family aircraft can be handled at the same time at passengers apron next to the terminal building. On cargo apron two Ilyushin Il-76 or Airbus 330 freighter can be handled at the same time in two parking positions, or an Antonov An-124 or Boeing 747 cargo in one parking position.  Tuzla International Airport had a signed agreement with Turkish Airlines to service 130 cargo flights in 2016 from Istanbul with the Airbus A330F. The airport has mixed civil and military use and the airport is home to 3rd Helicopter Squadron of the Air Force of Bosnia and Herzegovina. Next to taxiway F, parallel with runway, there are 31 parking positions for helicopters Bell UH-1 or similar size.

Airport operating hours are from 03:30 to 24:00 LT for commercial air carriers and 06:00 to 17:00 LT for general/corporate aviation with a possible extension. Tuzla International Airport is ICAO-classified as ILS CAT I.

Airlines and destinations

The following airlines operate regular flights to and from Tuzla:

Statistics

Passenger development

Passenger route statistics

Freight statistics

Ground transport
Tuzla Airport is situated at a secondary road that leads to Kalesija to the east and to Živinice to the west. The main road to Sarajevo, Tuzla, and other cities across the country connects from there.

Bus services exist to Banja Luka, Sarajevo and Tuzla to/from the airport

See also
 List of airports in Bosnia and Herzegovina
 Sarajevo International Airport
 Mostar International Airport
 Banja Luka International Airport

References

External links

Official website

Buildings and structures in Tuzla
Airports in Bosnia and Herzegovina